Kothali can mean:

 Kothali, Maharashtra, a village in the Indian state of Maharashtra
 Kothali, Karnataka, a village in the Indian state of Karnataka